The Unimog 401 is an all-wheel-drive vehicle of the Unimog-series by Mercedes-Benz, developed as a tractor and equipment carrier. It was produced by Daimler-Benz in the Unimog plant in Gaggenau from 1953 to 1956. A total of 16,250 Unimog 401 and 402 were made. 

Initially, the Unimog 401 was made in the cabrio version only. The closed cab model Froschauge (German for frog-eye), with a cab made by Westfalia, was introduced in September 1953. An increased wheelbase model was developed, bearing model type 402. Both models were succeeded by the Unimog 411, available in both long and short wheelbases.

History 

After World War II, German engineer Albert Friedrich built the first Universalmotorgerät, however, Daimler-Benz declined to put it into series production. Manufacturer Boehringer in Göppingen on the other hand was interested and produced a prototype for the 1948 DLG-exhibition in Frankfurt. The Unimog attracted much interest, encouraging Boehringer to begin series production. Until 1950, approximately 600 Unimog 70.200 were made; their brand logo was an ox-head with U-shaped horns. In late 1950, Daimler-Benz purchased Boehringer moving Unimog production to Gaggenau, beginning series production in May 1951. Initially, the Unimog's type number was 2010, changing to 401 in 1953, with the 401 becoming a new type. The Unimog 401 was the first Unimog to receive the Mercedes star on its grille.

Technical description 

The Unimog 401 is a very compact vehicle with an approximate length of just . It has a U-shaped ladder frame, beam portal axles both in the rear and front, with four same-sized wheels. Each axle has additional reduction gears built in. Both front and rear axles are supported by a central joint and panhard rods. The 401 has coil springs and hydraulic shock absorbers. Daimler-Benz used 6.5–20" multi-purpose tyres, that are designed for both on and off-road applications. The brake system is hydraulic, the 401 having drum brakes for each wheel.

Engine and gearbox 

The 401 uses a car engine, type OM 636 VI. The OM 636 is mounted slightly inclined towards the rear, in the front of the Unimog. It has an electric starter.

The Unimog 401 uses a Daimler-Benz six-speed constant-mesh gearbox with two additional reverse gears. It has clutch-independent switchable all-wheel drive and differential locks for the front and rear axles. The clutch is a Fichtel & Sachs single-disc-dry-clutch. Daimler-Benz offered an additional two-speed crawler-gearbox as a factory option.

Features and accessories 

The 401 uses a 150 W Bosch alternator, a 12 V / 105 Ah lead-acid battery, two headlights, two rear lamps, electric trafficators, windscreen wipers and a horn. A plug socket for a trailer was offered as a factory option.

The 401 has a spring-mounted hitch in the rear and a standard hitch in the front. For additional equipment, it has an anchor rail.

For power take-off, the Unimog was available with front and rear PTOs (DIN 9611, 540 rpm). Daimler-Benz also offered a spare wheel, rear twin tyres, a trailer-brake-system, a winch, a mowing bar and air compressors for the 401.

The previous Unimog 2010 was offered as a cabrio with a foldable top, a concealing windscreen, removable side windows and a rigid rear panel. It was available in the colour Unimog-grün. After developing the 2010 into the 401, the closed cab was offered. The cabrio version then became Version A while the cab-version became Version A/F. Unimogs with a trailer-brake-system were called Version B and Version B/F. Unimogs with a closed cab were available in the paint colours Unimog-grün, hellgrau and Mercedes-blau.

Technical specifications

Bibliography 

Werner Oswald: Mercedes-Benz Lastwagen und Omnibusse 1886–1986. Motorbuch Verlag Stuttgart, 2008, .

References 

Tractors
Mercedes-Benz trucks